Zhang Lu (1464–1538) was a Chinese landscape painter during the Ming Dynasty (1368–1644).

Zhang was born in Xiangfu (祥符; present-day Kaifeng, Henan) into a wealthy family and educated with princes of the imperial family. He attained great success as a professional painter but lived very simply, almost as a hermit. He began his study of painting by emulating the leading court painter, Wang E, but quickly turned from the academy to other models and masters. His courtesy name was Tianchi (天馳) and his pseudonym was Pingshan (平山). He was a student of Wu Wei. Zhang followed the Zhe school of painting. He painted landscapes and human figures in a free and uninhibited style.

Notes

References
 Cihai. Shanghai: Shanghai ci shu chu ban she, 1979.

1464 births
1538 deaths
Ming dynasty landscape painters
People from Kaifeng
Painters from Henan